Eric Loder (born 20 July 1952) is a Swiss racing cyclist. He rode in the 1976 Tour de France.

References

1952 births
Living people
Swiss male cyclists
Place of birth missing (living people)